Acodia is a genus of moths in the family Geometridae erected by Rudolph Rosenstock in 1885.

Species
 Acodia chytrodes (Turner, 1926)
 Acodia orina (Turner, 1926)
 Acodia pauper Rosenstock, 1885

References

Xanthorhoini
Geometridae genera